Lazar Vasić (born January 3, 2001) is a Serbian professional basketball player who currently plays for Vršac of the Basketball League of Serbia as a loaned player of Crvena zvezda mts.

Early career 
Vasić started to play basketball for KK Abba from Barič. In summer 2014, he was added to the Crvena zvezda youth team. He won the second place at the 2017–18 Junior ABA League season with the Zvezda. Over six tournament games, he averaged 6.5 points, 4.0 rebounds and 3.3 assists per game.

Professional career 
In January 2018, Vasić was added to the Crvena zvezda ABA League roster for the rest of the 2017–18 season. He missed to play a single game during that season. On February 13, 2019, Vasić was added to the 2019 Crvena zvezda Radivoj Korać Cup roster. He missed to play a single game at the Cup tournament. On March 19, 2019, Vasić signed his first professional contract for Crvena zvezda. On 4 September 2019, he was loaned to Tamiš for the 2019–20 season. Prior to the 2020–21 season, Vasić was added to the roster of FMP. In December 2020, he was added to the ABA roster.

National team career
Vasić was a member of the Serbian under-16 national team that participated at the 2016 FIBA Europe Under-16 Championship in Poland. Over seven tournament games, he averaged 0.6 points, 1.6 rebounds and 1.7 assists per game. Next year, he was a member of the team that won the bronze medal at the 2017 FIBA Europe Under-16 Championship in Montenegro. Over seven tournament games, he averaged 5.0 points, 1.7 rebounds and 2.1 assists per game.

Vasić was a member of the Serbian under-17 team that participated at the 2018 FIBA Under-17 Basketball World Cup in Argentina. Over seven tournament games, he averaged 4.7 points, 2.0 rebounds and 3.1 assists per game.

References

External links 
 Profile at eurobasket.com
 Profile at euroleague.net
 Profile at realgm.com
 Profile at ABA League

2001 births
Living people
ABA League players
Basketball League of Serbia players
Basketball players from Belgrade
KK Crvena zvezda youth players
KK FMP players
KK Tamiš players
KK Slodes players
KK Vršac players
Point guards
Serbian men's basketball players